Edmund Dantes Lowe (March 3, 1890 – April 21, 1971) was an American actor. His formative experience began in vaudeville and silent film.

Biography
Lowe was born in San Jose, California.  His father was a local judge. His childhood home was at 314 North 1st Street, San Jose. He attended Santa Clara College and entertained the idea of becoming a priest before starting his acting career. He died in Woodland Hills, California, of lung cancer and is buried at San Fernando Mission Cemetery, Mission Hills, California.

Film career

Lowe's career included over 100 films.  He is best remembered for his role as Sergeant Quirt in the 1926 silent movie What Price Glory? directed by Raoul Walsh. During the sound era, a musical comedy remake and two sequels were produced, all starring Lowe and Victor McLaglen, with the first two also directed by Raoul Walsh. Lowe reprised his role from the movies in the radio program Captain Flagg and Sergeant Quirt, broadcast on the Blue Network September 28, 1941 - January 25, 1942, and on NBC February 13, 1942 - April 3, 1942.) Despite making a smooth transition to talking pictures, by the mid 1930s he was no longer a major star, although he occasionally played leading man to the likes of Mae West and Claudette Colbert. He portrayed the young doctor trying to get out of an affair with Wallace Beery's character's wife, played by Jean Harlow, in Dinner at Eight (1933). He remained a supporting actor at the major studios while continuing in leads for such "Poverty Row" studios as Columbia Pictures, where his skills could bolster low-budget productions. He also starred in 35 episodes of the 1950s television show Front Page Detective and appeared as the elderly lead villain in the first episode of Maverick opposite James Garner in 1957.

Marriages
After his first marriage to Esther Miller ended in early 1925, Lowe met Lilyan Tashman while filming Ports of Call. Lowe and Tashman were married on September 21, 1925, before the release of the film. The two had homes in Beverly Hills and Malibu. They were married until Tashman's death from cancer at age 37 in 1934.

Seventy years after Tashman's death, author E.J. Fleming claimed Lowe was a homosexual and Tashman was a lesbian.  If the claims were true, fan magazine writers and newspaper columnists made no mention of them during Tashman's lifetime, or for seventy years after her death.

Lowe's third wife was costume designer Rita Kaufman. They were married from 1936 to 1950.

Filmography

 The Wild Olive (1915) as Charles Conquest
 The Spreading Dawn (1917) as Captain Lewis Nugent
 Vive la France! (1918) as Jean Picard
 Someone Must Pay (1919) as Jim Burke 
 Eyes of Youth (1919) as Peter Judson
 The Woman Gives (1920) as Robert Milton
 A Woman's Business (1920) as Johnny Lister
 Someone in the House (1920) as Jim Burke
 Madonnas and Men (1920) as Gordon Turner
 The Devil (1921) as Paul de Veaux
 My Lady's Latchkey (1921) as Nelson Smith
 Living Lies (1922) as Dixon Grant
 Peacock Alley (1922) as Phil Garrison
 The Silent Command (1923) as Capt. Richard Decatur
 In the Palace of the King (1923) as Don John
 Wife in Name Only (1923) as Norman Arleigh
 The White Flower (1923) as Bob Rutherford
 Nellie, the Beautiful Cloak Model (1924) as Jack Carroll
 Honor Among Men (1924) as Prince Kaloney
 Barbara Frietchie (1924) as Captain William Trumbull
 The Brass Bowl (1924) as Dan Maitland
 East of Suez (1925) as George Tevis
 Greater Than a Crown (1925) as Tom Conway 
 Marriage in Transit (1925) as Cyril Gordon
 The Winding Stair (1925) as Paul
 The Kiss Barrier (1925) as Richard March
 Champion of Lost Causes (1925) as Loring
 Ports of Call (1925) as Kirk Rainsford
 East Lynne (1925) as Archibald Carlyle
 The Fool (1925) as Daniel Gilchrist
 Soul Mates (1925) as Lord Tancred
 What Price Glory? (1926) as 1st Sergeant Quirt
 Siberia (1926) as Leonid Petroff
 The Palace of Pleasure (1926) as Ricardo Madons
 Black Paradise (1926) as Graham
 The Wizard (1927) as Stanley Gordon
 Publicity Madness (1927) as Pete Clark
 Is Zat So? (1927) as Hap Harley
 One Increasing Purpose (1927) as Sim Paris
 Dressed to Kill (1928) as 'Mile-Away Barry'
 Outcast (1928) as Geoffrey
 Happiness Ahead (1928) as Babe Stewart 
 In Old Arizona (1929) as Sgt. Mickey Dunn
 This Thing Called Love (1929) as Robert Collings
 The Cock-Eyed World (1929) as Sgt. Harry Quirt
 The Painted Angel  (1929) as Brood
 Thru Different Eyes (1929) as Harvey Manning
 Making the Grade (1929) as Herbert Littell Dodsworth
 Happy Days (1929) as Show Performer
 Good Intentions (1930) as David Cresson
 The Bad One (1930) as Jerry Flanagan
 Born Reckless (1930) as Louis Berretti
 Part Time Wife (1930) as Jim Murdock
 Scotland Yard (1930) as Dakin Barrolles
 Transatlantic (1931) as Monty Greer
 Don't Bet on Women (1931) as Roger Fallon 
 The Spider (1931) as Chatrand
 The Cisco Kid (1931) as Sgt. Michael Patrick "Mickey" Dunn
 Women of All Nations (1931) as Sergeant Harry Quirt
 Men on Call (1931) as Chuck Long
 The Devil Is Driving (1932) as Orville "Gabby" Denton
 Misleading Lady (1932) as Jack Craigen
 Chandu the Magician (1932) as Chandu
 Attorney for the Defense (1932) as William J. Burton
 Guilty as Hell (1932) as Russell Kirk
 Dinner at Eight (1933) as Dr. Wayne Talbot
 Let's Fall in Love (1933) as Ken Lane
 I Love That Man (1933) as Brains Stanley
 Hot Pepper (1933) as Harry Quirt
 Her Bodyguard (1933) as Casey McCarthy
 Gift of Gab (1934) as Philip Gabney
 Bombay Mail (1934) as Inspector Dyke
 No More Women (1934) as Three Time
 The Great Impersonation (1935) as Sir Everend Dominey
 Black Sheep (1935) as John Francis Dugan
 The Great Hotel Murder (1935) as Roger Blackwood
 The Best Man Wins (1935) as Toby
 King Solomon of Broadway (1935) as King Solomon
 Thunder in the Night (1935) as Captain Karl Torok
 Grand Exit (1935) as Tom Fletcher
 Under Pressure (1935) as Shocker Dugan
 Mister Dynamite (1935) as "Dynamite" T.N. Thompson
 Seven Sinners (1936) as Harwood
 Mad Holiday (1936) as Philip Trent
 The Garden Murder Case (1936) as Philo Vance
 The Girl on the Front Page (1936) as "Hank" Gilman
 The Squeaker (1937) as Barrabal 
 Espionage (1937) as Kenneth
 Every Day's a Holiday (1937) as Capt. Jim McCarey
 Murder on Diamond Row (1937) as Barrabal
 Under Cover of Night (1937) as Christopher Cross
 Newsboys' Home (1938) as Perry Warner
 Secrets of a Nurse (1938) as John Dodge
 The Witness Vanishes (1939) as Mark Peters
 Our Neighbors – The Carters (1939) as Bill Hastings
 Wolf of New York (1940) as Chris Faulkner
 Honeymoon Deferred (1940) as Adam Farradene
 The Crooked Road (1940) as Danny Driscoll / John Vincent / George Atwater
 I Love You Again (1940) as Duke Sheldon
 Men Against the Sky (1940) as Dan McLean
 Double Date (1941) as Roger Baldwin
 Flying Cadets (1941) as Captain Rockcliffe 'Lucky Rocky' Ames
 Call Out the Marines (1942) as Harry Curtis
 Klondike Fury (1942) as Dr. John Mandre
 Murder in Times Square (1943) as Cory Williams
 Dangerous Blondes (1943) as Ralph McCormick
 The Girl in the Case (1944) as William Warner
 Oh, What a Night (1944) as Rand
 Dillinger (1945) as Specs Green
 The Enchanted Forest (1945) as Steven Blaine
 The Strange Mr. Gregory (1946) as Mr. Gregory / Lane Talbot
 Good Sam (1948) as H.C. Borden
 Intruder in the Dust (1950) as Gowrie twin
 Around the World in 80 Days (1956) as the engineer of the SS Henrietta
 Wings of Eagles (1957) as Admiral Moffett
 The Last Hurrah (1958) as Johnny Byrne (uncredited)
 Plunderers of Painted Flats (1959) as Ned East
 Heller in Pink Tights (1960) as Manfred 'Doc' Montague (final film role)

References

External links

Edmund Lowe at Virtual History

1890 births
1971 deaths
American male film actors
American male musical theatre actors
American male silent film actors
Vaudeville performers
20th-century American male actors
Burials at San Fernando Mission Cemetery
Male actors from San Jose, California
Santa Clara University alumni
20th-century American singers
20th-century American male singers
American people of German descent